Pioneer was the first of three submarines privately developed and paid for by Horace Lawson Hunley, James McClintock, and Baxter Watson.

While the United States Navy was constructing its first submarine, USS Alligator, during the American Civil War in late 1861, the Confederates were doing so as well. Hunley, McClintock and Watson built Pioneer in New Orleans, Louisiana. Pioneer was tested in February 1862 in the Mississippi River, and later was towed to Lake Pontchartrain for additional trials, but the Union advance towards New Orleans the following month prompted the men to abandon development and scuttle Pioneer in the New Basin Canal on 25 April 1862.

The scuttled Pioneer was raised and examined by Union troops. The Times-Picayune of New Orleans of 15 February 1868 reported Pioneer had been sold for scrap.

The Bayou St. John submarine, now in the collection of the Louisiana State Museum, was for decades misidentified as Pioneer. The Bayou St. John submarine and Pioneer may have undergone trials at about the same time and confusion between the two may date back to contemporary accounts; it is not clear which of the two was constructed first.

A life-size model of Pioneer can be viewed and explored at Maritime Museum Louisiana, in Madisonville, Louisiana.

References

Submarines of the Confederate States Navy
Louisiana in the American Civil War
Pioneer (sub)
Hand-cranked submarines
Scuttled vessels
Shipwrecks of the American Civil War
Shipwrecks of the Mississippi River
Maritime incidents in April 1862
1862 ships